The following is a list of events relating to television in Ireland from 2016.

Events
17 January – The Sunday Business Post reports that Virgin Media Ireland have plans to launch additional TV3 channels, including a 24-hour rolling news channel. The TV3 Group later denies such reports.
20 January – RTÉ announces that it has partnered with Freesat, the UK free-to-air television company, to develop a new product for Saorview, Ireland’s free digital television service and the largest television platform in Ireland.
24 April – Michael Lawson wins the fifth series of The Voice of Ireland.
27 June – Children's strand 3Kids launches on 3e.
3 July – Irish TV has received ministerial approval from Minister for Communications Denis Naughten to launch on the Irish Digital Terrestrial Saorview platform.
5 July – Following the purchase of Setanta Sports' Irish operations by Eircom, Setanta Sports Ireland is renamed Eir Sport 1 and Setanta Sports 1 is renamed Eir Sport 2.
11 July – ITV plc announces that it has sold UTV Ireland to TV3 Group for €10 million. As part of the deal, TV3 Group inherits UTV Ireland's ten-year program supply contract with ITV. 
3 August – RTÉ announces its intention to replace The Voice of Ireland with an Irish version of Strictly Come Dancing.
18 November – Jennifer Zamparelli and Nicky Byrne are chosen to present RTÉ One's forthcoming series Dancing with the Stars.
22 November – It is announced that Coronation Street and Emmerdale will move from UTV Ireland back to TV3 beginning on 5 December.
1 December – TV3's The 7 O'Clock Show is moved forward an hour and renamed The 6 O'Clock Show in order to facilitate the return of Emmerdale and Coronation Street to the channel.
6 December – It is announced that TV3, along with 3e and its newly purchased channel UTV Ireland, will receive new logos, idents and new schedules.
21 December – Irish TV confirms it will cease broadcasting.

Debuts

RTÉ
3 January – Rebellion on RTÉ One (2016)
1 February – Bridget & Eamon on RTÉ Two (2016–2019)
10 February – 1916: The Irish Rebellion. (First part of a 3-part documentary) on RTÉ One.
21 April – First Dates on RTÉ Two (2016–present)
6 November – Know The Score on RTÉ One (2016)

TV3
22 September – Gogglebox Ireland (2016–present)

TG4
19 September –  Inspector Gadget (2015–2018)

Ongoing television programmes

1960s
 RTÉ News: Nine O'Clock (1961–present)
 RTÉ News: Six One (1962–present)
 The Late Late Show (1962–present)

1970s
 The Late Late Toy Show (1975–present)
 The Sunday Game (1979–present)

1980s
 Fair City (1989–present)
 RTÉ News: One O'Clock (1989–present)

1990s
 Would You Believe (1990s–present)
 Winning Streak (1990–present)
 Prime Time (1992–present)
 Nuacht RTÉ (1995–present)
 Nuacht TG4 (1996–present)
 Ros na Rún (1996–present)
 TV3 News (1998–present)
 Ireland AM (1999–present)
 Telly Bingo (1999–present)

2000s
 Nationwide (2000–present)
 TV3 News at 5.30 (2001–present) – now known as the 5.30
 Against the Head (2003–present)
 news2day (2003–present)
 Other Voices (2003–present)
 Saturday Night with Miriam (2005–present)
 The Week in Politics (2006–present)
 Tonight with Vincent Browne (2007–2017)
 Xposé (2007–2019)
 At Your Service (2008–present)
 Championship Live (2008–present) – Now rebranded as GAA on 3
 Operation Transformation (2008–present)
 3e News (2009–present)
 Dragons' Den (2009–present)
 Two Tube (2009–present)

2010s
 Jack Taylor (2010–present)
 Love/Hate (2010–present)
 Mrs. Brown's Boys (2011–present)
 The GAA Show (2011–present)
 MasterChef Ireland (2011–present)
 Irish Pictorial Weekly (2012–present)
 Today (2012–present)
 The Works (2012–present)
 Deception (2013–present)
 Celebrity MasterChef Ireland (2013–present)
 Second Captains Live (2013–present)
 Claire Byrne Live (2015–present)
 The Restaurant (2015–present)
 Red Rock (2015–present)
 TV3 News at 8 (2015–present)
 Ireland Live (2015–2017)

Ending this year
24 April - The Voice of Ireland (2012–2016)
28 October – The Fall (2013–2016)
23 December – Midday (2008–2016)
Unknown date - Republic of Telly (2009–2016) and The Mario Rosenstock Show (2012–2016)

Deaths
31 January – Terry Wogan, 77, Irish-British radio and television broadcaster.

See also
2016 in Ireland

References